Pantanaw is a town in the Ayeyarwady Region of south-west Myanmar. It is the seat of the Pantanaw Township in the Maubin District. It is the hometown of former United Nations Secretary-General U Thant and of the renowned artist U Ba Nyan.

Populated places in Ayeyarwady Region
Township capitals of Myanmar